The  Pontifical Basilica of St. Michael is a baroque Roman Catholic church and minor basilica in central Madrid, Spain. It is located in San Justo Street, adjacent to the  Archbishop's Palace. It is the church of the Apostolic Nunciature to the Kingdom of Spain of the Holy See and is now administrated by the priests of  Opus Dei.

History 
Construction began in 1739, on the site of the parish church of Sts. Justus and Pastor. The work was commissioned by Cardinal Infante Luis of Chinchón, Archbishop of Toledo, who subsidized construction with 1,421,000 reales.  Construction was completed in 1745.

After the Napoleonic invasion, the church added the advocacy of Saint Michael (San Miguel), when the nearby parish church of San Miguel de los Octoes was torn down.

The original plans have been attributed to Santiago Bonavía, with perhaps an earlier contribution of Teodoro Ardemans. It was completed by Vigilio Rabaglio to Gandria. On the facade, the allegorical statues of charity, faith, hope, and fortitude were sculpted by Roberto Michel and Nicolás Caresana. A panel by Caresana, on the facade depicts the martyrdom of Santos Justo y Pastor. The cupola is decorated with frescos (1745), by Bartolomé Rusca, depicting the apotheosis of Santos Justo y Pastor.

Interior 
Among the wood sculptures housed in the interior is the "Cristo de la Fe y del Perdón", by Luis Salvador Carmona.

Burials 
The Italian composer Luigi Boccherini, who died in Madrid, was buried here until 1927, when Benito Mussolini repatriated the remains to the church of San Francesco in his native town Lucca.

Gallery

See also 
 Catholic Church in Spain
 List of oldest church buildings
 Opus Dei

References

External links 

 Official website of the  Pontifical Basilica of St. Michael

Michael
Baroque architecture in Madrid
Bien de Interés Cultural landmarks in Madrid
Basilica churches in Spain
18th-century Roman Catholic church buildings in Spain
Roman Catholic churches completed in 1745
1745 establishments in Spain
Buildings and structures in Palacio neighborhood, Madrid